IBM PowerHA SystemMirror (formerly IBM PowerHA and HACMP) is IBM's solution for high-availability clusters on the AIX Unix and Linux for IBM System p platforms and stands for High Availability Cluster Multiprocessing. IBM's HACMP product was first shipped in 1991 and is now in its 20th release - PowerHA SystemMirror for AIX 7.1.

PowerHA can run on up to 32 computers or nodes, each of which is either actively running an application (active) or waiting to take over when another node fails (passive).  Data on file systems can be shared between systems in the cluster.

PowerHA relies heavily on IBM's Reliable Scalable Cluster Technology (RSCT). PowerHA is an RSCT aware client. RSCT is distributed with AIX. RSCT includes a daemon called group services that coordinates the response to events of interest to the cluster (for example, an interface or a node fails, or an administrator makes a change to the cluster configuration).  Up until PowerHA V6.1, RSCT also monitored cluster nodes, networks and network adapters for failures using the topology services daemon (topsvcs).  In the current release (V7.1), RSCT provides coordinate response between nodes, but monitoring and communication are provided by the Cluster Aware AIX (CAA) infrastructure.

The 7.1 release of PowerHA relies heavily on CAA, a clustering infrastructure built into the operating system and exploited by RSCT and PowerHA. CAA provides the monitoring and communication infrastructure for PowerHA and other clustering solutions on AIX, as well as cluster-wide event notification using the Autonomic Health Advisor File System (AHAFS) and cluster-aware AIX commands with clcmd.  CAA replaces the function provided by Topology Services (topsvcs) in RSCT in previous releases of PowerHA/HACMP .

IBM PowerHA SystemMirror Timeline

IBM PowerHA SystemMirror Releases

 PowerHA SystemMirror 7
 New User Interface.
 PowerHA SystemMirror 7.1.1 .
 PowerHA 6 
 PowerHA 6.1, Rebranded again to IBM PowerHA SystemMirror for AIX, GA Oct 27 2009, 
 Now in Standard and Enterprise Editions
 EMC SRDF support
 GLVM 2-site Configuration Wizard
 Improvements to SMIT panels and File Collections
 IPv6 support
 HACMP 5
 HACMP 5.5, Rebranded to IBM PowerHA, GA Nov 2008, 
 Asynchronous replication support
 Updated support for DLPAR/CUOD to include support for IBM POWER5 and POWER6 processors
 Support for LPAR mobility to relocate critical applications
 PowerHA/XD PPRC support of Global Mirror when used with SAN Volume Controller
 Function to allow PowerHA/XD PPRC to support multiple storage subsystems at each site
 Better integration with the AIX operating system by avoiding modifications to the TCP/IP bringing up process
 HACMP 5.4.1, Nov 2007, announcement
 AIX Workload Partitions support (WPAR)
 New GLVM monitoring 
 NFSv4 support improvements
 HACMP 5.4, July 2006, announcement
 Web-based GUI
 Nondisruptive HACMP cluster startup, upgrades, and maintenance
 HACMP 5.3, August 2005
 HACMP 5.2, July 2004
 HACMP 5.1, July 2003
 HACMP 4
 HACMP 4.5, July 2002
 HACMP 4.4, June 2000
 HACMP 4.3
 HACMP 4.2
 Adds Cluster Single Point of Control (CSPOC) feature
 Dynamic Reconfig

See also
 High-availability cluster
 Live Partition Mobility

References

External links
 HACMP Homepage
 (PDF) HACMP Best Practices Whitepaper, July 2007 Update
 HACMP/PowerHA Hints and Tips
 HACMP for AIX documentation
 HACMP for AIX Certified Systems Expert Requirements 
 HACMP Version Compatibility Matrix
 PowerHA Technical Forum
 AIX Health Check

High Availability Cluster Multiprocessing
High-availability cluster computing
Cluster computing